A tan line is a visually clear division on the human skin between an area of pronounced comparative paleness relative to other areas that have been suntanned by exposure to ultraviolet (UV) radiation or by sunless tanning. The source of the radiation may be the sun, or artificial UV sources such as tanning lamps. Tan lines are usually an inadvertent result of a work environment or of recreational activities, but are sometimes intentional. Many people regard visible tan lines as unsightly and seek to avoid tan lines that will be visible when regular clothes are worn.

Occupation-related tan lines

Farmer's tan

A "farmer's tan" (also called "golfer's tan", "sailor's tan" , or "tennis tan") refers to the typical tan lines developed by regular outdoor activity when wearing a short sleeve shirt. The farmer's tan usually starts with a suntan covering the exposed parts of the arms and neck. It is distinct in that the shoulders, chest, and back remain unaffected by the sun. Tennis and golf additionally cause recognizable tans on the middle section of the legs, due to the wearing of shorts and socks for prolonged hours in the sun.

The "Texas tan" is similar, with the exception that the shoulders are also affected by the sun, caused by working outdoors while wearing a sleeveless shirt.

Some of the common tan lines associated with a farmer's tan include:
 elbows (from a short-sleeve shirt)
 neck (from shirt collar)
 thighs (if shorts are worn)
 ankles (from socks, only if exposed)
 forehead (if a hat is worn)
 wrist (if a watch is worn)
 eyes (if sunglasses are worn)

Driver's tan
A "driver's tan" (or similar terms such as "trucker's tan" or "taxi driver's arm") is a tanning pattern where one arm from the sleeve downward is tanned significantly more than the other arm, due to extensive driving of a motor vehicle with the window down.

Sandal tan
A "sandal tan" is a set of distinctive tan lines on the feet, resulting from the straps of sandals worn throughout the summer by such different professions as lifeguards and monks.

Recreation-related tan lines

Bikini tan

Wearing a bikini in the sun results in the uncovered skin becoming suntanned and creates a "bikini tan". These tan lines separate pale breasts, crotch, and buttocks from otherwise tanned skin. "Racing stripes" may refer to the portion of a bikini tan line exposed when wearing one-piece swimwear.

Biker's tan
A "biker's tan" is a tan line three-quarters up each leg, where lycra bike shorts would normally begin to cover. Depending on the activity, the inner side of the arms may be paler than the outer side. Unless the biker uses cycling gloves made to allow tanning, the area on the back of each hand will usually not be tanned.

Goggle tan
Raccoon-like tan lines can emerge around the eyes after wearing goggles, common among industrial workers (wearing safety glasses), skiers, snowboarders, and swimmers.

Golfers tan 
A golfers tan is typically a tan on the back of a shaved or bald head that forms when a baseball cap is worn. There is a semicircle shaped tan that forms from the strap which adjusts the hat's size. With between 3 and 5 hours spent out on the course in direct sunlight, sunburn, poor tan lines and heat exhaustion are regular occurrences for the unprepared golfer.

Other recreation-related tan lines
 "Soccer tan" — a stripe of tan from the lower thighs to the bottom of the knees common to soccer players; the upper thighs and lower legs are covered by shorts and shin guards/socks.
 "Football tan" — a stripe of tan from below the knees to just above the ankle; the thighs, knees and ankles are covered by uniform pants and ankle socks.  Often the arms are tanned similarly to a farmer's tan, but the face is untanned due to wearing a helmet.  This tanning effect can be particularly pronounced since many football teams run two-a-day practices during the summer.
 "Tiger tan" — two tan stripes on the arm of a lacrosse player, resulting from the gaps between gloves, elbow pads, and shoulder pads.

Intentional tan lines

One of the common uses for tanning beds is the option of tanning completely nude to reduce the appearance of tan lines. In contrast, some people prefer to have tan lines, and will wear undergarments or swimwear with the deliberate purpose of creating a sharply defined tan line.

Additionally, "tanning stickers" can be purchased that attach to the skin while tanning.  Common designs are a heart, Playboy bunny, and dolphins; but many different designs exist.  These are typically sold on a roll of 500 to 1000 as single-use, disposable stickers.  People can place the sticker on the same area each time they tan (indoors or outdoors) and this will leave the covered area pale, while the rest of their skin tans normally.  This allows individuals to see their tanning progress, and allows others to see as well if the "tan tattoo" is in an exposed area.

It is also possible to use sunscreen to create intentional tan lines that form patterns or words, to make a statement or simply create a design.

Avoiding tan lines
The wearing of clothes while tanning results in creation of tan lines, which many people regard as un-aesthetic. Many people want to avoid tan lines on those parts of the body which will be visible when they are fully clothed. Some people try to achieve an all-over tan or to maximize their tan coverage. To achieve an all-over tan, tanners need to dispense with clothing; and to maximize coverage, they need to minimize the amount of clothing they wear while tanning. For women who cannot dispense with a swimsuit, they at times tan with the back strap undone while lying on the front, or removing shoulder straps, besides wearing swimsuits which cover less area than their normal clothing. Any exposure is subject to local community standards and personal choice. Some people tan in the privacy of their backyard where they can at times tan without clothes, and some countries have set aside clothing-optional swimming areas (popularly known as nude beaches), where people can tan and swim clothes-free. Some people tan topless, and others wear very brief swimwear, such as a microkini or thong.

A 1969 innovation is tan-through swimwear, which uses fabric perforated with thousands of micro holes that are nearly invisible to the naked eye, but which transmit enough sunlight to approach an all-over tan, especially if the fabric is stretched taut. Tan-through swimwear typically allows more than one-third of UV rays to pass through (equivalent to SPF 3 or less), and an application of sunscreen even to the covered area is recommended.

References

Sun tanning